The Viešnautas (or Trakupis) is a river of  Kėdainiai district municipality, Kaunas County, central Lithuania. It is a tributary of the Liaudė, which flows into the Nevėžis, a tributary of the Neman.

It originates in the Serbentynė Forest, 3 km from Miegėnai village. It runs to the South East and East, on the western edge of the Sosiai forest. It passes through the villages Pamiškės, Antanava, Alksnupiai, Trakupiai.

The name Trakupis means 'glade river' (from Lithuanian trakas 'a glade, cutting, undergrowth').

References

Rivers of Lithuania
Kėdainiai District Municipality